Meharon ki dhani, is a small village in Jaisalmer district of Rajasthan state in India. Village is located around 26.15511 N latitude, 70.90740 E longitude and 128 kilometers form District Headquarters, Jaisalmer city.
Village is famous for granite stone "Lakha Red".

History
The village at its current location was founded in 1910 by AllahRakha Mehar(He was founder of meharon ki dhani from kunda) He had done lot of struggle for MKD's muslim community . Second phase of development started after beginning of granite by Murad Ali Mehar and   some peoples started mining company Mehar Granite Industries, M.M. Granite and later Sabu Granite Industries which are today largest producer of lakha red granite. Some other quarries are Sona Granite,PMG,LMG and Allahrakha Granite. all these are owned by affluent families of village.

Demographics 
Most of the people of village believe in Islam, and are Sindhis Muslim. They speak Sindhi language.
As of 2001 India census, Meharon ki dhani had a population of 745 with 387 male and 358 female. This Muslim village has a below average literacy rate, male literacy is 50 percent, and female literacy is around 10 percent. People are spending heavily on boys' education but female education is still not common because of conservative nature of society.

Economy 
Granite Industry is rapidly growing in this village because of red stone. First granite quarry was started in 1998 by a Gujarati businessman, now there are around 30 granite quarries and 1 tile cutting factory is running in the outskirts of village.M M Granite (Asia biggest mines of Lakha red granite with unique color of red granite )  & salakh & Fatan granite ,  Sabu Granite Industries and Mehar Granite Industries R K granite,   is a leading company in this sector controlling around 40% of production, transportation and finished products. Because of granite industry some other industries like transport and dairy have grown in recent years.

Main occupation of resident of this village is farming. People grow pearl millet (bajra), pulses in the monsoon season and wheat and cash crop like cumin (jeera)and mustard in winter season. Few years back people were only relied on monsoon rain for their farming but now irrigated farms are becoming more common.

Some people also keep sheep and goat herd for milk, meat and wool. But this occupation is becoming extinct because low profit and availability of well paid jobs in granite industry.

Education
There is middle school in the village with a computer center, volleyball Court and cricket ground. Because of good income from granite sector and irrigated farming people are sending their children to cities like Sikar, Jaipur, Jodhpur and Kota to provide quality education. Village has maximum number of graduate and government servant in all Muslim village of district.

Transportation
The village is well connected with Road.
It is connected with road to  nearby  cities like Barmer, Jaisalmer, Jodhpur. Now-a-days people prefer to use private vehicle over public transport because of low frequency and overcrowding.

References

External links 

Villages in Jaisalmer district